NGC 480 is a spiral galaxy located about 546 million light-years away from Earth in the constellation Cetus. NGC 480 was discovered by American astronomer Francis Leavenworth In 1886.

See also 
 Barred spiral galaxy 
 List of NGC objects (1–1000)
 NGC 1300
 NGC 491

References

External links 

Spiral galaxies
Cetus (constellation)
0480
004845
Astronomical objects discovered in 1886
Discoveries by Francis Leavenworth